Equine alphaherpesvirus 9 (EHV-9) is a species of virus in the genus Varicellovirus, subfamily Alphaherpesvirinae, family Herpesviridae, and order Herpesvirales. It was first isolated from a case of epizootic encephalitis in a herd of Thomson's gazelle (Gazella thomsoni) in 1993.  Fatal encephalitis was reported from Thomson's gazelle, giraffe, and polar bear   in natural infections. The virus was reported in an aborted Persian onager and a polar bear.

References

External links
 

Varicelloviruses
Animal viral diseases